Fanconi may refer to:
 Fanconi anemia, a genetic disease
 Fanconi syndrome, a kidney disease
 Guido Fanconi (1892–1979), a Swiss pediatrician